Ashokan was a former railroad station located in the Shokan section of the town of Olive, Ulster County, New York, United States. Located  from the terminus at Kingston Point in Kingston, it was located along the Ulster and Delaware Railroad, later the Catskill Mountain Branch of the New York Central Railroad. The station opened on June 8, 1913, when the railroad abandoned their former alignment due to the construction of the Ashokan Reservoir. The railroad moved the station depot at Brown's Station to Ashokan for service. 

The New York Central Railroad discontinued passenger service on the line on March 31, 1954. The depot would then be moved to Woodstock, New York in May 1970.

References

External links
 Catskill Mountain Railroad

Railway stations in the Catskill Mountains
Former New York Central Railroad stations
Railway stations in the United States opened in 1913
Railway stations closed in 1954
Railway stations in Ulster County, New York
Former railway stations in New York (state)